Campbell Graham (born 2 June 1999) is an Australian professional rugby league footballer who plays as a  or er for the South Sydney Rabbitohs in the NRL and Australia at international level.

Background
Graham was born in Sydney, New South Wales, to British-born parents; his father is from Glasgow, Scotland while his mother is from Coventry, England.

He played his junior rugby league for the Coogee Wombats and Maroubra Lions, before being signed by the South Sydney Rabbitohs. He completed his Higher School Certificate at Marcellin College Randwick in 2017.

Playing career

Early career
In 2016 and 2017, Graham played for the South Sydney Rabbitohs' NYC team. 

Late in 2016, he played for the Australian Schoolboys.

2017
In February, Graham re-signed with South Sydney on a contract until the end of 2019. In round 22 of the 2017 NRL season, he made his NRL debut for South Sydney against St. George Illawarra. He wasn't named in the original 21-man squad that NRL teams are required to pick a game day 17-man squad from, but was allowed to play after Souths sought and were granted an exemption by the NRL to include him after a late injury to Robert Jennings.

Graham was named in Scotland's squad for the 2017 World Cup at the end of the season, but withdrew in order to get a full off-season of training.

2018
Graham spent the first few weeks of the 2018 NRL season playing for South Sydney's feeder side North Sydney in the Intrust Super Premiership NSW.  In round 9 of the 2018 season, Graham scored his first NRL try in South Sydney's 36-18 win over the Newcastle Knights at McDonald Jones Stadium.
Graham made a total of 16 appearances for Souths in 2018 scoring 7 tries as Souths reached the preliminary final against arch rival Eastern Suburbs but lost the match 12-4 with Graham playing on the wing.

2019
In round 3 of the 2019 NRL season, Graham scored 2 tries as Souths defeated the Gold Coast 28-20 at ANZ Stadium.  In round 19 against St. George, Graham scored a try after the siren had sounded as Souths won the match 20-16 after being down 16-14 with a minute remaining.

In round 21 Graham scored a hat-trick in a 26-16 loss to Melbourne Storm at Central Coast Stadium. He was selected at number 4 in Freddy's Team of the Week following his try scoring effort.
Graham made a total of 27 appearances and scored 14 tries for Souths in the 2019 NRL season as the club reached their second consecutive preliminary final in a row.  Graham scored a try in the preliminary final against the Canberra Raiders but ultimately it wasn't enough as Canberra won the game 16-10.

On 7 October, Graham was selected on the wing for the U23 Australian team.

Graham was called into the Australian squad for the 2019 Rugby League World Cup 9s for the injured Curtis Scott.

2020
In round 15 of the 2020 NRL season, Graham scored two tries in a 56-16 victory over Manly-Warringah at ANZ Stadium.

The following week, Graham scored two tries in a 38-0 victory over Parramatta at Bankwest Stadium.

In round 18 against Wests Tigers, Graham scored two tries in a 26-24 victory at Bankwest Stadium.

Graham played a total of 21 games scoring 13 tries.  He played in two of South Sydney's three finals games, missing the preliminary final loss to Penrith through injury.

2021
In round 8 of the 2021 NRL season against Canberra, Graham fractured his hand in South Sydney's victory. He was later ruled out for four weeks.

In round 15 of the 2021 NRL season, Graham scored two tries for South Sydney in a 46-0 victory over Brisbane.

The following week, he scored two tries for Souths in a 38-22 victory over Wests Tigers at an empty Leichhardt Oval.

In round 25, Graham scored two tries for South Sydney in a 20-16 victory over St. George Illawarra.

Graham played a total of 21 games for South Sydney in the 2021 NRL season including the club's 2021 NRL Grand Final defeat against Penrith.

2022
On 5 July, it was confirmed that Graham would be ruled out for six-eight weeks with a fractured cheekbone.  Graham sustained the injury in South Sydney's 30-12 victory over Parramatta.

Graham returned to the South Sydney side in round 23 of the 2022 NRL season against Penrith.  Graham scored a try in the clubs 26-22 loss.

Graham played 20 matches for South Sydney in the 2022 NRL season including all three of the clubs finals matches as they reached the preliminary final for a fifth straight season.  Souths would lose in the preliminary final to eventual premiers Penrith 32-12.

In October he was named in the Australia squad for the 2021 Rugby League World Cup. In the second group stage match at the 2021 Rugby League World Cup, Graham made his debut for Australia, scoring a hat-trick in a 84-0 victory over Scotland.

In the final group stage match, Graham scored two tries for Australia in their 66-6 victory over Italy.

References

External links

South Sydney Rabbitohs profile
Rabbitohs profile
NRL profile

1999 births
Living people
Australia national rugby league team players
Australian rugby league players
Australian people of Scottish descent
Australian people of English descent
North Sydney Bears NSW Cup players
Rugby league wingers
Rugby league centres
Rugby league players from Sydney
South Sydney Rabbitohs players